Bronisław Żurakowski (26 June 1911 – 4 October 2009) was a Polish engineer, aeroplane constructor, and glider test pilot. 

Before the war Żurakowski worked in the RWD bureau, where he designed aircraft RWD-17, RWD-17W, RWD-20 and  made calculations for RWD-16bis, RWD-21 and RWD-23. After the war he designed the first Polish helicopter BŻ-1 GIL and later a helicopter BŻ-4 Żuk (both designated BŻ for his initials). He was a co-designer of a successful utility plane PZL-104 Wilga.

Born in Makiejowka, Bronisław is a brother of test pilot Janusz Żurakowski.

References

Bronisław Żurakowski's obituary

1911 births
2009 deaths
Polish aerospace engineers
Polish aviators
Polish test pilots